Aqeel Abbas Jafri  (born August 10, 1957 in Karachi, Pakistan), is a Pakistani writer, poet and architect and chief editor of Urdu Dictionary Board in Pakistan.

Works 
Jafri spent 20 years compiling and writing Pakistan Chronicle, which was published in 2010. The book has rare photographs and accounts of historic events from August 14, 1947 (Independence Day of Pakistan) to March 31, 2010. This book reads like a fact-sheet on Pakistani events with over 4000 pictures on its 1,080 pages.

References

External links
 Pakistan Chronicle an encyclopaedic account of Pakistan history

1957 births
Living people
Writers from Karachi
Architects from Karachi
Journalists from Karachi
Pakistani television journalists
Pakistani literary critics
21st-century Pakistani historians
Muhajir people